Saghar is a village in Saghar District in Afghanistan's Ghor Province. It is located at 33°42'0N 63°52'0E with an altitude of 2235 metres (7335 feet).

See also
Ghōr Province

References

Populated places in Ghor Province
Villages in Afghanistan